Kutana is a rural locality (a selo), the only inhabited locality, and the administrative center of Anaminsky National Rural Okrug of Aldansky District in the Sakha Republic, Russia, located  from Aldan, the administrative center of the district. Its population as of the 2010 Census was 576, of whom 318 were male and 255 female, down from 658 as recorded during the 2002 Census.

References

Notes

Sources
Official website of the Sakha Republic. Registry of the Administrative-Territorial Divisions of the Sakha Republic. Aldansky District. 

Rural localities in Aldansky District